Espresso is a coffee beverage.

Espresso may also refer to:

 Espresso (microprocessor), used in the Wii U game console
 Espresso, the development name for the T-Mobile myTouch 3G Slide
 Espresso Book Machine, a printing press
 Espresso heuristic logic minimizer, circuit design software
 L'Espresso, an Italian magazine
 Quantum ESPRESSO, a chemistry software suite
 ESPRESSO, a spectrographic instrument of the Very Large Telescope array in northern Chile
 Expresso Telecom, African telecommunications services company, active in Mauritania, Senegal and Sudan.

See also
 Maruti Suzuki S-Presso, an automobile
 Express (disambiguation)
 Expresso (disambiguation)